The Indianapolis Colts, formerly the Baltimore Colts, are an American football team playing in the National Football League (NFL). In 1953, a Baltimore-based group led by Carroll Rosenbloom gained the rights to a new Baltimore franchise. Rosenbloom was granted an NFL team, and was awarded the holdings of the defunct Dallas Texans organization, the descendant of the last remaining Ohio League founding APFA member Dayton Triangles. The new team kept the Triangles' blue and white color scheme and was named the Colts after the unrelated previous team that folded after the 1950 NFL season. After 31 seasons in Baltimore, Colts owner Robert Irsay moved the team to Indianapolis, Indiana.

The Colts have won two Super Bowl championships (Super Bowl V and Super Bowl XLI). They also played in and lost Super Bowl III and Super Bowl XLIV. Before the AFL and NFL merged in 1970, they won three NFL Championships (1958, 1959, and 1968). By winning Super Bowl XLI the Colts became the first team that played its home games in a domed stadium to win a Super Bowl held in an outdoor stadium.

After the Colts owner Jim Irsay hired Tony Dungy in 2002, the Colts made the playoffs for nine straight seasons. They won five straight AFC South titles from 2003 to 2007 and had seven consecutive seasons of 12 or more victories from 2003 to 2009, the first time that has been achieved in the NFL's 90-year history. Much of the team's success throughout the 2000s was attributed to the trio of general manager Bill Polian, coach Dungy, and quarterback Peyton Manning.

In the 2013 season, the Colts secured their first division championship since Manning's departure and first under quarterback Andrew Luck and head coach Chuck Pagano. As of 2021, they are the only team in the AFC South to win a Super Bowl (the Tennessee Titans have not won any Super Bowls either in Tennessee or in their previous incarnation as the Houston Oilers, while the Colts won the Super Bowl in 1970 while in Baltimore and the 2006 title while in Indianapolis).

Table key

Season records

All-time records

Notes
The Finish, Won, Lost, and Ties columns list regular season results and exclude any postseason play. Regular season and postseason results are combined only at the bottom of the list.
All regular season MVPs listed are the Associated Press MVP. For the full list of other MVPs see National Football League Most Valuable Player Award.
All Coach of the Year Awards listed are the Associated Press award. For the full list of other coaching awards see National Football League Coach of the Year Award.
This game would be later known as The Greatest Game Ever Played.
The 1967 NFL season marks the first season in the league's history where the league was divided into two conferences which were subdivided into two divisions. Up to 1967, the league was either divided into two divisions, two conferences, or neither.
The Colts and Dolphins finished tied. However, the Colts finished ahead of Miami in the AFC East based on a head-to-head sweep (2–0).
The Colts and Patriots finished tied. However, the Colts finished ahead of New England based on a better division record (7–1 to Patriots' 6–2).
The Colts and Dolphins finished tied. However, the Colts finished ahead of Miami based on better conference record (9–3 to Dolphins' 8–4).
The game involved the infamous Ghost to the Post play.
1982 was a strike-shortened season so the league was divided up into two conferences instead of its normal divisional alignment.
A 24-day players' strike reduced the 16-game season to 15, causing week 3 to be canceled.
This was the last game played in the RCA Dome.
Arians served as interim head coach for twelve games during the season due to Pagano's leukemia diagnosis, posting a 9–3 record en route to the AP NFL Coach of the Year award.

References
General

Specific

External links

 
Indianapolis Colts
Seasons
seasons